The 2023 Vienna Vikings season is the second season of the defending champion Vienna Vikings in the third season of the European League of Football.

Preseason
For the new season, the coaching staff and front office demonstrated stability in continuing their work. In contrast, the main sponsor Automobile Dacia didn't extended the contract with the club and franchise. The team will also change conferences, playing in the Eastern Conference without its longterm rival Raiders Tirol, but still having inter-conference games.

Regular season

Standings

Roster

Staff

Notes

References 

Vienna Vikings season
Vienna Vikings
Vienna Vikings